Sh2-201 is an emission nebula in the Cassiopeia constellation.  It is in the eastern part of the constellation along the eastern border of the IC 1848.  The nebula is 9980 light-years away from Earth.  It is also seen close to Sh2-199.

References

Cassiopeia (constellation)
Emission nebulae

Sharpless objects